Ray C. Wakefield (August 12, 1895 – September 29, 1949) was an American attorney who served as a Commissioner of the Federal Communications Commission from 1941 to 1947.

References

1895 births
1949 deaths
Members of the Federal Communications Commission
California Republicans
Franklin D. Roosevelt administration personnel
Truman administration personnel